The  is a Class A major river in the western part of Okayama Prefecture. It acts as the main drainage for the Takahashi River Drainage System, and is one of the three main drainage rivers in Okayama Prefecture (the others being the Yoshii River and the Asahi River).

Description
It flows through the cities of Niimi, Takahashi, Sōja, and Kurashiki, eventually flowing into the Mizushimanada area of the Inland Sea. The mouth is located between the Mizushima and Tamashima areas of Kurashiki. Reconstruction and repairs in 1907 created the eastern and western branches of the Takahashi River.

Major tributaries
: Flows from the northeast area of Hiroshima Prefecture to the western part of Okayama Prefecture.

References

Rivers of Hiroshima Prefecture
Rivers of Okayama Prefecture
Rivers of Japan